The F União (F-45) is a Niterói-class frigate of the Brazilian Navy. The União was the sixth ship of her class ordered by the Brazilian Navy, on 20 September 1970. The União was launched on 14 March 1975, and was commissioned on 12 September 1980.

History
In 2003, União underwent the modernization process, which provided the vessel with an increase in its operating life. At the time, weapons and submarine detection systems were replaced by state-of-the-art equipment, in view of the obsolescence of the original equipment.

Since November 2011, União has been the main vessel of the Maritime Task Force (MTF), the maritime unit of UNIFIL operations in the Middle East, leading three ships from Germany, two from Bangladesh, one Greek, one Turkish and one from Indonesia. The Brazilian unit is equipped with a helicopter and has a crew of 243 Brazilian military personnel.

Gallery

External links 

 MarineTraffic

References

Niteroi-class frigates
1975 ships
Ships built in Southampton
Frigates of the Cold War